Dons of Disco is a 2018 American documentary film directed by Jonathan Sutak. It details the career of the Italo disco musical artist Den Harrow and controversy surrounding his identity. Tom Hooker, who provided vocals for a number of Den Harrow recordings, seeks credit for his vocal performances attributed to Den Harrow. Through interviews with the producers and performers who created Den Harrow, the history of the musical project is detailed.

Synopsis

Den Harrow is presented as a charismatic American pop star from Boston whose popularity was on par with Madonna and Michael Jackson in 1980s Italy, but rumors existed that someone was ghostwriting his music. Producers Roberto Turatti and Miki Chieregato, whose credits appear on Den Harrow releases, are described as his "secret voice." In time, American musician Tom Hooker was brought on to the Den Harrow project. Though born in America, he moved to Italy from Switzerland to pursue a career in music.

The group spotted Stefano Zandri dancing in a night club and asked him to be a pop star, dubbing him "Den Harrow" after the Italian word for money, denaro. Signing to Baby Records, label founder Freddy Naggiar asked them to locate a singer who can "sing in good English." Hooker volunteered, becoming the "voice" of Den Harrow. With the producers and Hooker working behind the scenes tirelessly, a sound was created for Den Harrow as Zandri performed across Europe.

By 1987, in order to not reveal Hooker's involvement as vocalist for Den Harrow, support for a Tom Hooker single was pulled in favor of Den Harrow's "Don't Break My Heart."  By 1994, Hooker moved back to America to marry his American girlfriend, thus pursuing a career in surreal photography under the name Thomas Barbèy.

Although silent for decades, Hooker takes to the internet to claim ownership of vocals for a number of Den Harrow releases, culminating in a YouTube video that credits Hooker for vocals on these songs.

Recounting Den Harrow's origins, Zandri indicates that he was convinced to allow Hooker to provide vocals while he lip synced. He speaks favorably of the arrangement, which resulted in Den Harrow at the top of pop charts in Italy for years, and accusing Hooker of breaking a Gentlemen's agreement that will tarnish the reputation of Den Harrow.

After years of turning down such events, Hooker agrees to perform at a concert with Liz Mitchell and Thomas Anders, performing his own catalog of songs, including his own hits. At the show, Tom Hooker introduces Den Harrow as a "Milli Vanilli"-type project. During the Chicago concert, all acts were shutdown and tickets were refunded by LA Concert Group due major sound issues that could not be fixed.  The rest of the tour went on successfully  

On discovering Hooker's "Bad Boy" video, a Den Harrow fan noticed it was the same voice as Den. From here, Turatti explains the many voices of Den Harrow, including Chuck Rolando, Silver Pozzoli, as well as Hooker and even Zandri himself.

Following the earlier debacle, Hooker and Chieregato continue on the tour and perform a Los Angeles concert.  Hooker signs autographs after the show, telling a fan that Zandri had no involvement in the Den Harrow recordings. Contrasting this attitude, Zandri is interviewed crediting Hooker as a great writer with a great voice. He wonders where Hooker's anger comes from, believing it stems from being abandoned as a solo artist as Den Harrow took off, which is inaccurate.  Zandri was left alone for many years to perform using Hooker’s voice during his concerts, until he decided to go on television and take credit for all of Hooker’s songs, including singing Hooker’s own songs. Once Hooker saw that, he had enough.  Had Zandri stayed quiet, none of this would have happened and he could have continued on quietly.  

Although Hooker has had a successful career, Zandri relates the financial difficulties he has faced since the 1990s, where it was found that his accountant had not been paying taxes on Den Harrow earning, having all assets seized. Unable to find a job, Zandri did local shows using his own voice, singing over Hooker’s vocals. 

After six years, he was offered a role on the reality show L'isola dei famosi, eventually meeting his wife and settling down in Milan.

Stefano Zandri expresses a desire to sever his association with Den Harrow, claiming that any mention of Den Harrow reminds him that Tom Hooker views Zandri as nothing more than a puppet. However, when asked to perform at a rebuilt German discotheque named New Galaxis, Zandri agrees to perform as Den Harrow.  During soundcheck, Zandri gives the sound technician a backing track that he can sing to. Believing he would lipsync, Zandri surprises everyone by singing "Future Brain." He goes on to perform at New Galaxis to an enthusiastic crowd.

A screenshot of a Facebook update from Zandri indicates him thanking Turatti, Chieregato, and Hooker for their contributions in creating Den Harrow, but what no one realizes is that Tom Hooker never saw it because he was blocked from his page, which Zandri was fully aware of. Although this is what Tom Hooker claims to have wanted all along, he declines a duet after Zandri reaches out to him, claiming that Zandri is not a singer and he doesn’t want anything to do with him after Zandri kept slandering his wife and family.

Release
The film debuted on October 15, 2018, at the Rome Film Festival. It saw wide release through streaming platforms on December 17, 2020.

Critical reception
Writing for The New Yorker, Richard Brody compliments the clarity in tone found in the film being "consistently reportorial in tone and wink-free, even while presenting situations of such a hyperbolic wonder that they feel unreal."

References

External links 
 

2018 documentary films
American documentary films
2010s American films